Heinrich Fassbender (May 24, 1899 – June 22, 1971) was a German politician of the Free Democratic Party (FDP) and former member of the German Bundestag.

Life 
Fassbender was a member of the Hessian State Parliament from 1946 until February 12, 1948, when he resigned because he was elected Hessian member of the Bizone Economic Council (until 1949). In the 1949 Bundestag elections, he was elected to the German Bundestag, of which he was a member until 1957. In 1953 he was elected as a direct candidate in the Waldeck constituency of the Bundestag.

Literature

References

1899 births
1971 deaths
Members of the Bundestag for Hesse
Members of the Bundestag 1953–1957
Members of the Bundestag 1949–1953
Members of the Bundestag for the Free Democratic Party (Germany)
Members of the Landtag of Hesse